The 2nd constituency of Loire is one of six French legislative constituencies in the Loire department, in the Auvergne-Rhône-Alpes region.

It consists of the (pre-2014 cantonal re-organisation) cantons of
Saint Étienne South-East 1, 2 and 3 and Saint Étienne South-West 1.
Its population was 
at the 1999 census.

Deputies

Election Results

2022

 
 
|-
| colspan="8" bgcolor="#E9E9E9"|
|-

2017

2012

References

2